The Witch is a ballet made by John Cranko to Maurice Ravel's Piano Concerto in G Major (1931). The premiere took place Friday, 18 August 1950 at the Royal Opera House, Covent Garden, London.

Original cast 
Melissa Hayden
Francisco Moncion

References

Ballets by John Cranko
New York City Ballet repertory
Ballets to the music of Maurice Ravel
1950 ballet premieres